The tabulating machine was an electromechanical machine designed to assist in summarizing information stored on punched cards. Invented by Herman Hollerith, the machine was developed to help process data for the 1890 U.S. Census. Later models were widely used for business applications such as accounting and inventory control. It spawned a class of machines, known as unit record equipment, and the data processing industry.

The term "Super Computing" was used by the New York World newspaper in 1931 to refer to a large custom-built tabulator that IBM made for Columbia University.

1890 census
The 1880 census had taken eight years to process.  Since the U.S. Constitution mandates a census every ten years to apportion both congressional representatives and direct taxes among the states, a combination of larger staff and faster-recording systems was required.

In the late 1880s Herman Hollerith, inspired by conductors using holes punched in different positions on a railway ticket to record traveler details such as gender and approximate age, invented the recording of data on a machine-readable medium. Prior uses of machine-readable media had been for lists of instructions (not data) to drive programmed machines such as Jacquard looms.  "After some initial trials with paper tape, he settled on punched cards..."  Hollerith used punched cards with round holes, 12 rows, and 24 columns. The cards measured 3-1/4 inches by 6-5/8 inches. His tabulator used electromechanical solenoids to increment mechanical counters. A set of spring-loaded wires were suspended over the card reader. The card sat over pools of mercury, pools corresponding to the possible hole positions in the card.  When the wires were pressed onto the card, punched holes allowed wires to dip into the mercury pools, making an electrical contact that could be used for counting, sorting, and setting off a bell to let the operator know the card had been read. The tabulator had 40 counters, each with a dial divided into 100 divisions, with two indicator hands; one which stepped one unit with each counting pulse, the other which advanced one unit every time the other dial made a complete revolution. This arrangement allowed a count of up to 9,999.  During a given tabulating run, counters could be assigned to a specific hole or, by using relay logic, to a combination of holes, e.g. to count married females. If the card was to be sorted, a compartment lid of the sorting box would open for storage of the card, the choice of compartment depending on the data in the card.

Hollerith's method was used for the 1890 census. Clerks used keypunches to punch holes in the cards entering age, state of residence, gender, and other information from the returns. Some 100 million cards were generated and "the cards were only passed through the machines four times during the whole of the operations." According to the U.S. Census Bureau, the census results were "... finished months ahead of schedule and far under budget."

Following the 1890 census
The advantages of the technology were immediately apparent for accounting and tracking inventory.  Hollerith started his own business as The Hollerith Electric Tabulating System, specializing in punched card data processing equipment. In 1896 he incorporated the Tabulating Machine Company. In that year he introduced the Hollerith Integrating Tabulator, which could add numbers coded on punched cards, not just count the number of holes. Punched cards were still read manually using the pins and mercury pool reader. 1900 saw the Hollerith Automatic Feed Tabulator used in that year's U.S. census. A control panel was incorporated in the 1906 Type 1.

In 1911, four corporations, including Hollerith's firm, were amalgamated (via stock acquisition) to form a fifth company, the Computing-Tabulating-Recording Company (CTR). The Powers Accounting Machine Company was formed that same year and, like Hollerith, with machines first developed at the Census Bureau. In 1919 the first Bull tabulator prototype was developed. Tabulators that could print, and with removable control panels, appeared in the 1920s. In 1924 CTR was renamed International Business Machines (IBM).  In 1927 Remington Rand acquired the Powers Accounting Machine Company.  In 1933 The Tabulating Machine Company was subsumed into IBM. These companies continued to develop faster and more sophisticated tabulators, culminating in tabulators such as 1949 IBM 407 and 1952 Remington Rand 409. Tabulating machines continued to be used well after the introduction of commercial electronic computers in the 1950s.

Many applications using unit record tabulators were migrated to computers such as the IBM 1401.  Two programming languages, FARGO and RPG, were created to aid this migration.  Since tabulator control panels were based on the machine cycle, both FARGO and RPG emulated the notion of the machine cycle and training material showed the control panel vs. programming language coding sheet relationships.

Operation

In its basic form, a tabulating machine would read one card at a time, print portions (fields) of the card on fan-fold paper, possibly rearranged, and add one or more numbers punched on the card to one or more counters, called accumulators.  On early models, the accumulator register dials would be read manually after a card run to get totals. Later models could print totals directly. Cards with a particular punch could be treated as master cards causing different behavior. For example, customer master cards could be merged with sorted cards recording individual items purchased. When read by the tabulating machine to create invoices, the billing address and customer number would be printed from the master card, and then individual items purchased and their price would be printed. When the next master card was detected, the total price would be printed from the accumulator and the page ejected to the top of the next page, typically using a carriage control tape.

With successive stages or cycles of punched-card processing, fairly complex calculations could be made if one had a sufficient set of equipment. (In modern data processing terms, one can think of each stage as an SQL clause: SELECT (filter columns), then WHERE (filter cards, or "rows"), then maybe a GROUP BY for totals and counts, then a SORT BY; and then perhaps feed those back to another set of SELECT and WHERE cycles again if needed.) A human operator had to retrieve, load, and store the various card decks at each stage.

Selected models and timeline

Hollerith's first tabulators were used for the U.S. 1890 Census.

The first Tabulating Machine Company (TMC) automatic feed tabulator, operating at 150 cards/minute, was developed in 1906.

The first TMC printing tabulator was developed in 1920.

TMC Type IV Accounting Machine (later renamed the IBM 301), from the IBM Archives:
The 301 (better known as the Type IV) Accounting Machine was the first card-controlled machine to incorporate class selection, automatic subtraction, and printing of a net positive or negative balance. Dating to 1928, this machine exemplifies the transition from tabulating to accounting machines. The Type IV could list 100 cards per minute.

H.W.Egli - BULL Tabulator model T30, 1931

IBM 401: The 401, introduced in 1933, was an early entry in a long series of IBM alphabetic tabulators and accounting machines. It was developed by a team headed by J. R. Peirce and incorporated significant functions and features invented by A. W. Mills, F. J. Furman and E. J. Rabenda. The 401 added at a speed of 150 cards per minute and listed alphanumerical data at 80 cards per minute.

IBM 405: Introduced in 1934, the 405 Alphabetical Accounting Machine was the basic bookkeeping and accounting machine marketed by IBM for many years. Important features were expanded adding capacity, greater flexibility of counter grouping, direct printing of the entire alphabet, direct subtraction and printing of either debit or credit balance from any counter. Commonly called the 405 "tabulator," this machine remained the flagship of IBM's product line until after World War II. The British at Hut 8 used Hollerith machinery to gain some knowledge of Known-plaintext attack cribs used by encrypted German messages.

IBM 402 and 403, from 1948, were modernized successors to the 405.
 

The 1952 Bull Gamma 3 could be attached to this tabulator or to a card read/punch.

IBM 407Introduced in 1949, the 407 was the mainstay of the IBM unit record product line for almost three decades. It was later adapted to serve as an input/output peripheral for several early electronic calculators and computers. Its printing mechanism was used in the IBM 716 line printer for the IBM 700/7000 series and later with the IBM 1130 through the mid-1970s.
The IBM 407 Accounting Machine was withdrawn from marketing in 1976, signaling the end of the unit record era.

IBM 421

See also
 List of IBM products § Tabulators, Accounting machines
 British Tabulating Machine Company
 Powers Accounting Machine Company, Powers Accounting Machine
  Powers-Samas Accounting Machines Ltd aka. "Acc and Tab"
 Remington Rand Tabulating Machines
 UNIVAC 1004 80/90 Card Processor

For early use of tabulators for scientific computations see

 Leslie Comrie
 Wallace John Eckert

Notes

References

Further reading
 An accessible book of recollections (sometimes with errors), with photographs and descriptions of many unit record machines. The chapter It all adds Up describes IBM tabulators and accounting machines.

  Chapter 3, Tabulating Machines, has excerpts of Hollerith's 1889 An Electric Tabulating System and Couffignal's 1933 Calculating Machines: Their Principles and Evolution.
Black, Edwin (2001) IBM and the Holocaust: The Strategic Alliance Between Nazi Germany and America's Most Powerful Corporation, Crown Pub, . Assiduously footnoted using 20,000 hard copy documents and utilizing over 100 researchers, the book pieces together fragments of information from all of the world deliberately obscured to prevent the exposure of the extent to which IBM president Thomas J. Watson collaborated with the Nazis to identify Jews, locate them, determine what personal effects they owned, what businesses they controlled, their real estate, and anything else of value that could be seized by the Nazis. IBM tabulators also made it possible to move millions of Jews to their deaths in concentration camps using hundreds of thousands of rail cars and tons of coal in a process that would have been impossible without IBM. All the concentration camps contained offices specifically for the running and repair of the IBM tabulators which kept track of the age, gender and manner of death of every inmate. These machines, as well as other used by the German military, were leased to the Nazis in what became millions of dollars of profit for IBM.

External links

 Columbia University Computing History: Hollerith & IBM Tabulators and Accounting Machines
 IBM Archives: Electric tabulating machines (1930)
 IBM Archives: Electric accounting machines (1932)
 IBM Accounting Machine manuals

Computer-related introductions in 1890
American inventions
Mechanical calculators
Unit record equipment
IBM unit record equipment
Punched card